Way Back may refer to:

 The Way Back (2010 film), an American survival film directed by Peter Weir
 The Way Back (2020 film), a sports drama film starring Ben Affleck
 Way Back, a 2022 album by High Valley
 "Way Back" (John Conlee song), 1984
 "Way Back" (TLC song), 2017
 "Way Back", a song from the 2016 album Birds in the Trap Sing McKnight by Travis Scott
 "The Way Back", the first episode of sci-fi series Blake's 7
 The Way Back (novel), a 2020 novel by Gavriel Savit
 The Road Back (Der Weg Zurück), also translated as The Way Back, a 1931 novel by Erich Maria Remarque

See also 
 The Way, Way Back, a 2013 American film
 Wayback (disambiguation)
 No Way Back (disambiguation)